Osman Fahir Seden, usually credited as Osman F. Seden (March 22, 1924 – September 1, 1998), was a Turkish film director, screenwriter and film producer.

Filmography
Osman directed and wrote for over 120 films between 1955 and 1989.

They Paid With Their Blood (1955)
Sönen Yıldız (1956)
Revenge of the Flame (1956)
Berdus (1957)
A Handful of Soil (1957)
Altın Kafes (1958)
Beraber Ölelim (1958)
The Broken Disk (1959)
Gurbet (1959)
Düşman Yolları Kesti (1959)
Cilalı İbo Yıldızlar Arasında (1959)
For Chastity (1960)
Aşktan da Üstün (1961)
İki Aşk Arasında (1961)
Mahalleye Gelen Gelin (1961)
Aşk Hırsızı (1961)
Güzeller Resmi Geçidi (1961)
Sokak Kızı (1962)
Külhan Aşkı (1962)
Cilalı İbo Rüyalar Aleminde (1962)
Ayşecik Yavru Melek (1962)
Ne Şeker Şey (1962)
Yaralı Aslan (1963)
Kin (1963)
Bana Annemi Anlat (1963)
Badem Şekeri (1963)
Beni Osman Öldürdü (1963)
Anadolu Çocuğu (1964)
Koçum Benim (1964)
Beş Şeker Kız (1964)
Hızır Dede (1964)
Kral Arkadaşım (1964)
Affetmeyen Kadın (1964)
Sevinç Gözyaşları (1965)
Severek Ölenler: Kartalların Öcü (1965)
Şaka ile Karışık (1965)
Seven Kadın Unutmaz (1965)
Sana Layık Değilim (1965)
Elveda Sevgilim (1965)
Düğün Gecesi (1966)
Meleklerin İntikamı (1966)
Kenarın Dilberi (1966)
Akşam Güneşi (1966)
Çalıkuşu (1966)
Ağlayan Kadın (1967)
Hindistan Cevizi (1967)
Merhamet (1967)
İngiliz Kemal'in Oğlu (1968)
Hicran Gecesi (1968)
Gül ve Şeker (1968)
Ana Hakkı Ödenmez (1968)
Ottoman Eagle (1969)
Mısır'dan Gelen Gelin (1969)
Gülnaz Sultan (1969)
Yiğitlerin Türküsü (1970)
Mazi Kalbimde Yaradır (1970)
Son Günah (1970)
Her Günaha Bir Kurşun (1970)
Cilalı İbo Almanya'da (1970)
Tanrı Şahidimdir (1971)
Newyorklu Kız (1971)
İbiş Newyork Canavarı (1971)
Herşey Oğlum İçin (1971)
Gülüm, Dalım, Çiçeğim (1971)
Fakir Aşıkların Romanı (1971)
Yirmi Yıl Sonra (1972)
Mahkum (1972)
İlk Aşk (1972)
Aslanların Ölümü (1972)
Rabia (1973)
Hazreti Ömer'in Adaleti (1973)
Gurbetçiler (1973)
Gazi Kadın (1973)
Yaban (1974)
Erkekler Ağlamaz (1974)
Yaz Bekarı (1974)
Çirkin Dünya (1974)
Yüz Lira ile Evlenilmez (1974)
Teşekkür Ederim Büyükanne (1975)
Ateş Böceği (1975)
Bırakın Yaşayalım (1975)
Bir Ana Bir Kız (1975)
Nereden Çıktı Bu Velet (1975)
Güler misin Ağlar mısın (1975)
Beş Milyoncuk Borç Verir misin (1975)
Batsın Bu Dünya (1975)
Nereye Bakıyor Bu Adamlar (1976)
Her Gönülde Bir Aslan Yatar (1976)
Devlerin Aşkı (1976)
Delicesine (1976)
Bıktım Her Gün Ölmekten (1976)
Yuvanın Bekçileri (1977)
Meryem ve Oğulları (1977)
Hatasız Kul Olmaz (1977)
Vahşi Gelin (1978)
Şeref Sözü (1978)
Ana Ocağı (1978)
Silah Arkadaşları (1978)
Yüz Numaralı Adam (1978)
İyi Aile Çocuğu (1978)
İnek Şaban (1978)
Çilekeş (1978)
İnsan Sevince (1979)
Dokunmayın Şabanıma (1979)
Bekçiler Kralı (1979)
Beddua (1980)
Vazgeç Gönlüm (1980)
Durdurun Dünyayı (1980)
Ben Topraktan Bir Canım (1980)
Beş Parasız Adam (1980)
Şaka Yapma (1981)
Günah Defteri (1981)
Bir Damla Ateş (1981)
Kördüğüm (1982)
Yakılacak Kadın (1982)
Görgüsüzler (1982)
Sen de mi Leyla (1982)
Islak Mendil (1982)
Hülyam (1982)
Hasret Sancısı (1982)
Aşkların En Güzeli (1982)
Kahır (1983)
Haram (1983)
Gecelerin Kadını (1983)
Futboliye (1983)
Damga (1984)
Yabancı (1984)
Ömrümün Tek Gecesi (1984)
Nefret (1984)
Karanfilli Naciye (1984)
Tele Kızlar (1985)
Aslan Oğlum (1986)
Akrep (1986)
Dişi Kurt (1987)
Namusun Bedeli (1989)

References

External links
 Who is who database - Biography of Osman Fahir Seden 
 

1924 births
1998 deaths
Film people from Istanbul
Turkish film directors
Turkish male screenwriters
Turkish film producers
Deutsche Schule Istanbul alumni
Istanbul University Faculty of Law alumni
20th-century screenwriters